Peter Kevin Maher (born March 30, 1960 in Ottawa, Ontario) is a former Canadian marathon runner who competed mainly in the 1990s. He was a resident of Thornhill, a suburb of Toronto. He was credited for a brief period with the world record time for 25 km. Maher represented Canada in the Olympic men's marathons in Seoul, 1988 and Barcelona, 1992. He is said to be the originator of the quote "Running is a big question mark that's there each and every day. It asks you, 'Are you going to be a wimp or are you going to be strong today." Maher also now runs a Sports Therapy Clinic in Carrigaline, Cork, Ireland.

Achievements

See also
 Canadian records in track and field

References

External links
 
 
 
 
 
 

1960 births
Athletes (track and field) at the 1988 Summer Olympics
Athletes (track and field) at the 1992 Summer Olympics
Canadian male long-distance runners
Canadian people of German descent
Canadian people of Irish descent
Living people
Olympic track and field athletes of Canada
World Athletics Championships athletes for Canada
Athletes from Ottawa
Goodwill Games medalists in athletics
Competitors at the 1990 Goodwill Games